John Tolos, nicknamed "The Golden Greek", (September 18, 1930 – May 28, 2009) was a Canadian professional wrestler, and professional wrestling manager.

Professional wrestling career 

Tolos was born on September 18, 1930, in Hamilton, Ontario to Greek parents, Nicolaos and Evangelia (Evangeline) Tolos. During the 1950s and 60s, he was part of The Canadian Wrecking Crew with his brother Chris Tolos. On December 28, 1963, they captured the WWWF United States Tag Team Championship in Teaneck, New Jersey in two straight falls from Gorilla Monsoon and Killer Kowalski. While both teams were heels at the time, the Tolos Brothers did a television interview prior to the title match, "looking forward" to seeing all of their fans in Teaneck. That night, they were cheered throughout. As a vicious heel known as the "Golden Greek", Tolos also engaged in a long time rivalry with "Classy" Freddie Blassie in the LeBell family's World Wrestling Association, often feuding over the Americas Championship. Tolos had a run in Herb Abrams' Universal Wrestling Federation from 1990 to mid-1991, managing Cowboy Bob Orton, Cactus Jack and The Power Twins as well as serving as color commentator on the UWF's Fury Hour program.

Tolos joined the World Wrestling Federation (WWF) for a brief stint in mid-1991 as Coach (a classic coach, complete with a whistle), managing The Beverly Brothers and "Mr. Perfect" Curt Hennig, replacing Hennig's former manager Bobby "The Brain" Heenan, who was then moving into a full-time broadcaster's role. When a back injury sidelined Hennig for more than a year, Tolos was replaced by The Genius as The Beverly Brothers' manager and departed the WWF. Tolos would return to Abrams' UWF as color commentator from 1992 through the promotion's final show in 1994. He also managed Cowboy Bob Orton, The Power Twins and Cactus Jack.

Death
Tolos died in Los Angeles, California, on May 29, 2009, from kidney failure following a series of heart attacks and strokes.

Championships and accomplishments
50th State Big Time Wrestling
NWA Hawaii Heavyweight Championship (1 time)
NWA North American Heavyweight Championship (Hawaii version) (1 time)
NWA Hawaii Tag Team Championship (1 time) - with Steve Strong
Big Time Wrestling
NWA World Tag Team Championship (Detroit version) (1 time) - with Chris Tolos
California Pro Wrestling
CPW Heavyweight Championship (1 time)
Cauliflower Alley Club
Golden Potato Award (2004)
Championship Wrestling from Florida
NWA World Tag Team Championship (Florida version) (1 time) - with Chris Tolos
Heart of America Sports Attractions
NWA North American Tag Team Championship (Central States version) (1 time) – Baron von Helsinger
Maple Leaf Wrestling
NWA International Tag Team Championship (Toronto version) (3 times) - with Chris Tolos
National Wrestling Alliance
NWA Hall of Fame (Class of 2012)
NWA All-Star Wrestling
NWA Canadian Tag Team Championship (Vancouver version) (7 times) - with Tony Borne (2), Chris Tolos (2), Black Terror (1), Dutch Savage (1), and Don Leo Jonathan (1)
NWA Pacific Coast Heavyweight Championship (Vancouver version) (1 time)
NWA World Tag Team Championship (Vancouver version) (3 times) - with Tony Borne (1) and Chris Tolos (2)
NWA Hollywood Wrestling
NWA Americas Heavyweight Championship (10 times)
NWA Americas Tag Team Championship (6 times) - with Great Kojika (2), Louie Tillet (1), Rock Riddle (1), Chavo Guerrero (1), and The Assassin (1)
NWA "Beat the Champ" Television Championship (4 times)
NWA Brass Knuckles Championship (Los Angeles version) (3 times)
NWA United National Championship (1 time)
NWA Los Angeles
NWA International Television Tag Team Championship (1 time) - with Gene Kiniski
NWA San Francisco
NWA Pacific Coast Tag Team Championship (San Francisco version) (1 time) - with Chris Tolos
NWA Western States Sports
NWA Western States Tag Team Championship (1 time) - with Mr. Sato
Professional Wrestling Hall of Fame and Museum
Class of 2007 - Inducted as a member of the Canadian Wrecking Crew (with Chris Tolos)
Stampede Wrestling
NWA International Tag Team Championship (Calgary version) (1 time) - with Chris Tolos
Southwest Sports, Inc.
NWA Texas Tag Team Championship (1 time) - with Duke Keomuka
NWA Texas Heavyweight Championship (3 times)
Western States Alliance
WSA Heavyweight Championship (1 time)
WSA Tag Team Championship (1 time) - with Victor Rivera
World Wide Wrestling Federation
WWWF United States Tag Team Championship (1 time) - with Chris Tolos

References

External links 
Canadian Wrestling Page of Fame biography
SLAM! Wrestling Canadian Hall of Fame: Chris & John Tolos
Championship Wrestling from Florida - John Tolos
 

1930 births
2009 deaths
20th-century professional wrestlers
Canadian male professional wrestlers
Canadian people of Greek descent
Deaths from kidney failure
Professional wrestlers from Hamilton, Ontario
Professional wrestling announcers
Professional wrestling managers and valets
Professional Wrestling Hall of Fame and Museum
Stampede Wrestling alumni
NWA "Beat the Champ" Television Champions
NWA World Tag Team Champions (Florida version)
NWA International Tag Team Champions (Toronto version)
Stampede Wrestling International Tag Team Champions
NWA Americas Tag Team Champions
NWA Americas Heavyweight Champions
NWA United National Champions